Trumau is a town in the district of Baden in Lower Austria in Austria.

Geography
The river Triesting runs through the market town of Trumau. The town is situated between the south-west and north-east part of the Wiener Becken, on a sea level of 202 m. Trumau spreads over 18,57 km² and houses 3465 inhabitants.

History
The town was founded during the late Middle Ages, as a gift from the Babenberger Leopold IV to the Heiligenkreuz monastery.

Town name
The middle high German word ‚drum’ means endpiece. In the case of Trumau it could mean the end of the meadowlands.
In ancient documents, Trumau appears in the following versions: between 1137-1340: Trumowe, 1139 Drumau, 1178 Drumawe, between 1233 and 1294 Drumowe, between 1303 and 1306 Drumbuowe, 1340 Drumenaw, 1380 Drumpnaw, 1388 Drumpnow, 1463 Thrumbaw. Rumor has it that it was often referred to as ‚ drumðo’ among the inhabitants.

Population

Culture and Sights

Parish church
For more than 840 years, there has been a connection between the parish church of Trumau and the Zisterzienser monastery. 
In the course of the counter-reformation, under the reign of the Habsburgs, many parishes were founded. The emperor Rudolph II as well as bishop Urban, got the approval of Abbot Udalrich Molitor to build the parish church of Trumau in 1583. They agreed on the patronage one year later. At this time the parish of Trumau was under the control of the parish Traiskirchen, which was incorporated with the monastery Melk. The abbot of Heiligenkreuz arranged the construction of the church, which was then verifiably built by the master-builder "Maister Andre Stuber zu Paden". The work of the chisellers was carried out by the Italian brothers Elias and Alexius Payos, who were masters in this kind of work, from monastery’s own delf. The church was finished under Abbot Johannes Ruoff, and it was inaugurated by bishop Hector von Passau on February, 22nd 1588. John the Baptist is its patron saint.

Castle
The castle of Trumau is a moated castle in Trumau in Lower Austria. From the beginning it has been in the ownership of the Zisterzienserstift Heiligenkreuz. The castle was a present from the Babenberg’s Margrave Leopold IV. in 1138. 
In the 12th century, a grange was built by the Zisterzienser at the place where the castle is standing nowadays. At that time there has also probably been a water ditch, an overflow spillway and a mill with a mill stream. The Zisterziensers practiced agriculture, viniculture and sheep-breeding there. 
Towards the end of the 1st Austrian Türkenkrieg the courtyard was rebuilt from 1548 to 1558 because the estate had been totally destroyed in 1548. 
The building was burnt down by Hungarian rebels in 1621 during an anti-Habsburg riot. 
In 1650, abbot Michael Schnabel arranged the rebuilding to a castle, which was finished in 1667.  Emperor Leopold I. lingered several times at Castle Trumau. 
Since 1959, the castle also has a sundial. 
During the 5th Austrian Türkenkrieg the castle was heavily damaged in 1683. In course of the rebuilding, the towers were gravely changed. Further fires like in 1811 and 1880 damaged the castle again and again. 
The last restorations took place from 1993 until 1995. Two sundials were discovered in the inner yard. 
In 2009, the International Theological Institute moved into the castle Trumau.

References

 Hermann Watzl: Schloss Trumau. Seine Baugeschichte. Heiligenkreuzer-Verlag, Heiligenkreuz u. a. 1964, (Taschenbuch).
 Werner Richter, Bauamt Stift Heiligenkreuz: Kaiserstein im Stift und Schloss Trumau.
 Kurt Janetschek: Trumau im Wandel der Zeit. Eine Chronik, verfaßt anläßlich der Markterhebung am 4. Juni 1972. Marktgemeinde Trumau, Trumau 1972.
 Georg Dehio, Peter Aichinger-Rosenberger (Edit.): Niederösterreich südlich der Donau (Handbuch der Kunstdenkmäler Östrerreichs). Verlag Berger, Wien 2003,  (2 Vol.; here especially Vol. 2).
 Felix Halmer: Burgen und Schlösser zwischen Baden, Gutenstein und Wr. Neustadt. Wien: Birken-Verlag 1968 (Niederösterreich/1; Vol. 2).
 C. Martinic: Österreichisches Burgenlexikon. Linz: Landesverlag 1992, .
 Gerhard Stenzel: Von Schloß zu Schloß in Österreich. Wien: Kremayer & Scheriau 1976, .
 Schloss Trumau on Burgenkunde.at
 Schloss Trumau on Burgen Austria
 Municipal data of Trumau. In: Statistik Austria.
 noel.gv.at Municipal data, Statistics and Mandatory distribution

Cities and towns in Baden District, Austria